Raymond Beesly (10 July 1916 – 7 December 1997) was a South African cricketer. He played in 27 first-class matches for Border from 1938/39 to 1953/54.

See also
 List of Border representative cricketers

References

External links
 

1916 births
1997 deaths
South African cricketers
Border cricketers
Cricketers from Leicester
British emigrants to South Africa